Sharqia Governorate is the 3rd most populous of the governorates of Egypt.  Located in the northern part of the country, its capital is the city of Zagazig.

Overview

Bilbeis is the former capital of Sharqia. A section of the governorate once was part of the Qalyubia Governorate. There is a strong agriculture industry, poultry and fish farming in Sharqia.

The rate of poverty is more than 60% in this governorate but recently some social safety networks have been provided in the form of financial assistance and job opportunities. The funding has been coordinated by the country's Ministry of Finance and with assistance from international organizations.

Municipal divisions
The governorate is divided into the following municipal divisions for administrative purposes, with a total estimated population as of July 2017 of 7,192,355. In some instances there is a markaz and a kism with the same name.

Population
According to population estimates, in 2015 the majority of residents in the governorate lived in rural areas, with an urbanization rate of only 23.1%. Out of an estimated 6,485,412 people residing in the governorate in 2015, 4,987,707 people lived in rural areas and 1,497,705 lived in urban areas.

Industrial zones
According to the Governing Authority for Investment and Free Zones (GAFI) the governorate is home to two industrial zones. They are located in New Salhia, and in 10th of Ramadan.

Cities and towns
The following cities and towns are located in Sharqia Governorate.

Notable people
 El-Said Badawi, sociolinguist
 Mohamed Morsi, former President of Egypt
 Ahmed Shafik, former Prime Minister of Egypt and Presidential Candidate for Egyptian presidential election, 2012
 Abaza family, the largest family in Sharqia and Egypt's largest family of Circassian origin.
 Ahmed Subhy Mansour, founder of the Quranist movement
 Abdel Halim Hafez, popular singer and actor
 Miral al-Tahawy, award-winning Bedouin novelist
 Yusuf Abu Rayya, award-winning novelist
 Husayn Fawzi Al Najjar, political historian and Islamic scholar
 Magdi Yacoub, professor of cardiothoracic surgery at the National Heart and Lung Institute
 Sama El Masry, actress, belly dancer, and activist
 Ahmed Fouad Negm, Egyptian vernacular poet
 Rushdy Abaza, actor
 Fekry Pasha Abaza, journalist and political activist
 Ahmed 'Urabi, the leader of the 1881 nationalist uprising against the British
 Hamada Helal, Egyptian singer
 Emad Moteab, Egyptian footballer
 Ahmed el-Mansy, an Egyptian officer who was killed in clashes with terrorists in North Sinai

References

External links
 El Watan News of Sharqia Governorate

 
Governorates of Egypt